Rugby union in French Guiana is a minor but growing sport.

Governing body

The Comité Territorial de Rugby de Guyane is a committee under the umbrella of the French Rugby Federation which is the governing body for rugby union within French Guiana.

History
Rugby was first introduced to French Guiana by the French. More talented players tend to leave for Metropolitan France.

There have been occasional games against sides from the Caribbean islands, and nearby countries such as Trinidad and Tobago and Guyana. Most of its rugby contacts are either with them, or with France itself.

Honour board

National champions
 2015  Stade Cayennais
 2014  Stade Cayennais
 2013  Stade Cayennais
 2012  Stade Cayennais
 2011  Stade Cayennais
 2010  Stade Cayennais
 2009  Stade Cayennais
 2008 	Stade Cayennais
 2007 	Stade Cayennais
 2006 	Rugby Club de Kourou
 2005 	Rugby Club de Kourou
 2004 	Rugby Club de Kourou
 2003 	Stade Cayennais
 2002 	Stade Cayennais
 2001 	Stade Cayennais
 2000 	Stade Cayennais
 1999 	Stade Cayennais
 1998 	Stade Cayennais
 1997	CSA 3ème RSMA 
 1996 	Stade Cayennais
 1995 	Stade Cayennais
 1994 	Rugby Club de Kourou
 1993 	Rugby Club de Kourou
 1992 	Stade Cayennais
 1991 	Stade Cayennais
 1990 	COSMA Rugby
 1989 	Stade Cayennais
 1988 	Stade Cayennais
 1987 	Stade Cayennais
 1986 	Rugby Club de Kourou
 1985 	Rugby Club de Kourou
 1984 	Rugby Club de Kourou
 1983 	Stade Cayennais
 1982 	Rugby Club de Kourou
 1981 	Rugby Club de Kourou
 1980 	Rugby Club de Kourou
 1979 	Rugby Club de Kourou
 1978 	Rugby Club de Kourou
 1977 	Stade Cayennais
 1976 	Stade Cayennais
 1975 	Stade Cayennais
 1974 	Stade Cayennais

Cup Winners
 2015
 2014
 2013  Stade Cayennais
 2012  Stade Cayennais
 2011  COSMA Rugby
 2010  Stade Cayennais
 2009  Stade Cayennais
 2008 	Stade Cayennais
 2007 	Stade Cayennais
 2006 	Stade Cayennais
 2005 	Stade Cayennais
 2004 	Stade Cayennais
 2003 	Rugby Club de Kourou
 2002 	Stade Cayennais
 2001 	Stade Cayennais
 2000 	Stade Cayennais
 1999 	Stade Cayennais
 1998 	Stade Cayennais
 1997 	Stade Cayennais
 1996 	Stade Cayennais
 1995 	COSMA Rugby
 1994 	Rugby Club de Kourou
 1993 	Stade Cayennais
 1992 	Stade Cayennais
 1991 	Stade Cayennais
 1990 	Stade Cayennais
 1989 	Stade Cayennais
 1988 	Stade Cayennais
 1987 	Stade Cayennais
 1986 	Rugby Club de Kourou
 1985 	Stade Cayennais
 1984 	Rugby Club de Kourou

See also
 Rugby union in France

External links
 Comité Territorial de Rugby de Guyane
 Cosma Rugby XV

Reference list

 
Sport in French Guiana